Damir Zlomislić (born 20 July 1991) is a Bosnian professional footballer who plays as a midfielder for Bosnian Premier League club Zrinjski Mostar.

Club career
Zlomislić signed for Rijeka in mid-2013, and collected 19 league appearances. He also earned nine caps for Rijeka in the UEFA Europa League, scoring one goal. His first season with the club was interrupted by a long-term knee injury, which sidelined him from August 2013 until March 2014.

Given that he was a starter in only three league games in the first half of the 2014–15 season, in February 2015 Zlomislić was loaned to Brașov in Romania's Liga I for the remainder of the season. In July 2015, he was once again loaned, this time to Istra 1961 for the duration of the 2015–16 season. On 22 August 2015, he scored his first Prva HNL goal in Round 7 home match against Dinamo Zagreb.

On 3 July 2016, it was announced that Zlomislić signed for Gaziantep Büyükşehir Belediyespor in Turkey.

On 5 July 2018, Zlomislić signed a two-year-deal with Vojvodina.

In July 2019, Zrinjski Mostar announced they have reached an agreement with Zlomislić. He made his official debut for Zrinjski on 28 July 2019, in a 1–0 home league win against Velež Mostar in the Mostar derby. Zlomislić scored his first goal for Zrinjski in a league match against Krupa on 28 September 2020.

Honours
Široki Brijeg 
Bosnian Cup: 2012–13, 2016–17

Rijeka 
Croatian Cup: 2013–14

Zrinjski Mostar
Bosnian Premier League: 2021–22

References

External links

1991 births
Living people
People from Konjic
Croats of Bosnia and Herzegovina
Association football midfielders
Bosnia and Herzegovina footballers
Bosnia and Herzegovina youth international footballers
NK Široki Brijeg players
NK GOŠK Gabela players
FC Sellier & Bellot Vlašim players
HNK Rijeka players
HNK Rijeka II players
FC Brașov (1936) players
NK Istra 1961 players
Gaziantep F.K. footballers
FC Shakhtyor Soligorsk players
FK Vojvodina players
HŠK Zrinjski Mostar players
Premier League of Bosnia and Herzegovina players
Czech National Football League players
First League of the Federation of Bosnia and Herzegovina players
Croatian Football League players
Liga I players
TFF First League players
Belarusian Premier League players
Serbian SuperLiga players
Bosnia and Herzegovina expatriate footballers
Expatriate footballers in the Czech Republic
Bosnia and Herzegovina expatriate sportspeople in the Czech Republic
Expatriate footballers in Croatia
Bosnia and Herzegovina expatriate sportspeople in Croatia
Expatriate footballers in Romania
Bosnia and Herzegovina expatriate sportspeople in Romania
Expatriate footballers in Turkey
Bosnia and Herzegovina expatriate sportspeople in Turkey
Expatriate footballers in Belarus
Bosnia and Herzegovina expatriate sportspeople in Belarus
Expatriate footballers in Serbia
Bosnia and Herzegovina expatriate sportspeople in Serbia